Vitellaria paradoxa (formerly Butyrospermum parkii), commonly known as shea tree, shi tree, or vitellaria, is a tree of the family Sapotaceae. It is the only species in the genus Vitellaria, and is indigenous to Africa.

The shea fruit consists of a thin, tart, nutritious pulp that surrounds a relatively large, oil-rich seed from which shea butter is extracted.

The shea tree is a traditional African food plant. It has been claimed to have potential to improve nutrition, boost food supply in the "annual hungry season", foster rural development, and support sustainable land care.

Description
The tree starts bearing its first fruit when it is 10 to 15 years old; full production is attained when the tree is about 20 to 30 years old. It then produces nuts for up to 200 years.

The fruits resemble large plums 4 to 8 centimetres long weighing between 10 and 57 grams each.

Subspecies
Vitellaria paradoxa subsp. nilotica  -Cameroon, Mali, and Burkina Faso

Distribution and habitat

The shea tree grows naturally in the wild in the dry savannah belt of West and South from Senegal in the west to Sudan and South Sudan in the east, and onto the foothills of the Ethiopian highlands. It occurs in 19 countries across the African continent, namely Benin, Burkina Faso, Cameroon, Central African Republic, Chad, Ethiopia, Ghana, Guinea Bissau, Ivory Coast, Mali, Niger, Nigeria, Senegal, Sierra Leone, South Sudan, Sudan, Togo, Uganda, Democratic Republic of the Congo, and Guinea. The habitat area in total spans as wide as 5,000 square kilometres.

A testa found at the site of the medieval village of Saouga is evidence of shea butter production by the 14th century.

Uses
Shea butter has many uses and may or may not be refined. In the West it is most commonly used as an emollient in cosmetics and is less commonly used in food. Throughout Africa it is used extensively for food, is a major source of dietary fat, and for medicinal purposes. In Ghana and Nigeria, shea butter is a major ingredient for making the African black soap.

The edible protein-rich caterpillars of the moth Cirina butyrospermi which feed solely on its leaves are widely collected and eaten raw, dried or fried.

Composition of shea butter

Shea butter extract is a complex fat that in addition to many nonsaponifiable components (substances that cannot be fully converted into soap by treatment with alkali) contains the following fatty acids: oleic acid (40–60%), stearic acid (20–50%), linoleic acid (3–11%), palmitic acid (2–9%), linolenic acid (<1%) and arachidic acid (<1%). It also contains the vitamins A, E and F.

Etymology
The common name is shíyiri or shísu (lit. "shea tree") in the Bambara language of Mali. The tree is called ghariti in the Wolof language of Senegal, which is the origin of the French name of the tree and the butter, karité.

In Hausa language the tree is called Kaɗe or Kaɗanya. Indeed, the shea tree is so indispensable in Mole-Dagbang culinary and ethno-botanical practices that the Northern Ghanaian city of Tamale etymologically derives its name from the more traditional Dagomba name 'Tama-yile' (meaning 'Home of Shea nuts').

The tree was formerly classified in the genus Butyrospermum, meaning "butter seed". The species name parkii honors Scottish explorer Mungo Park, who learned of the tree while exploring Senegal. Park's Scottish origin is reflected in the English word shea, with a final -ea.

References

External links
 Vitellaria paradoxa. In: Brunken, U., et al. 2008. West African Plants — A Photo Guide. Forschungsinstitut Senckenberg, Frankfurt/Main.

Crops originating from Africa
Flora of Ivory Coast
Trees of Africa
Cosmetics chemicals
Sapotoideae
Monotypic Ericales genera
Sapotaceae genera